C. M. Pappukutty Bhagavathar (29 March 1913 – 22 June 2020) was an Indian singer and actor in Malayalam cinema.

Biography
Pappukutty Bhagavathar was born the second of five children on 29 March 1913 to Michael and Anna, in Vypin, Kochi, Kerala.

He had two brothers, Daniel and Varghese and two sisters, Rosy and Valsala. He studied at Government boys school Vypin.

He sang for the 2009 released Marykkundoru Kunjadu at the age of 95, sixty years after he sang his first song for a movie, which made him the oldest Malayali to sing in a film. The song "Entadukke Varum" was a hit. He was married to Baby. They had five children, actor Mohan Jose, playback singer Selma George, Sabu Jose, Shadhi, and Jeevan. His son-in-law K. G. George is a Malayalam movie director. He turned 100 in March 2013. His wife Baby died in 2017.

Bhagavathar died in Kochi in June 2020 at the age of 107 due to an age-related illness.

Bhagavathar was the father of actor Mohan Jose and singer Selma George. Malayalam film director K. G. George is his son-in-law.

Awards
 1991: Kerala Sangeetha Nataka Akademi Award (Drama)
 1997: Kerala Sangeetha Nataka Akademi Award (Classical Music)
 2004: Kerala Sangeetha Nataka Akademi Fellowship

Filmography

As an actor
 Prasanna (1950)
 Sthreehrudayam (1960)
 Oraal Koodi Kallanaayi (1964)
 Sree Guruvayoorappan (1964)
 Shyaamala Chechi (1965)
 Muthalaali (1965)
 Viruthan Shanku (1968)
 Anchusundarikal (1968)
 Kaattukurangu (1969)
 Padicha Kallan (1969)
 Vilakuranja Manushyar (1969)
 Arjun Dennis (Vice Chancellor) (1988)

As a playback singer
 "Vidhiyude Leela"... Prasanna 1950
 "Kallane Vazhiyil"... Karutha Kai 1964
 "Kanne Karale"... Aashaachakram 1973
 "Entadukke Vannadukkum"... Marykkundoru Kunjaadu 2010

References

External links
 Pappukutty Bhagavathar at MSI

20th-century Indian male actors
20th-century Indian singers
20th-century Indian male singers
Indian male film actors
Indian male playback singers
Malayalam playback singers
Male actors from Kochi
Male actors in Malayalam cinema
Singers from Kochi
1913 births
2020 deaths
Indian centenarians
Men centenarians
Recipients of the Kerala Sangeetha Nataka Akademi Fellowship
Recipients of the Kerala Sangeetha Nataka Akademi Award